This page provides the summary of the R-16 Korean National Championships held in Seoul, Korea. Winner advances to R-16 Korea World B-Boy Masters Championship.

Winners

Format
Prior preliminary battles are held to determine crew seeding and which crews advance to the quarter-finals.

Previous Results

2015 Korea National Championships
Location: Uijeongbu, Korea

In 2015, a new format for R16 was created. Crew battles now only consisted of 4 b-boys.  The winning crew joined the solo b-boy champion and two wild card b-boys for the world championships. Crews in bold won their respective battles.

2014 Korea National Championships
Location: Seoul, Korea

Crews in bold won their respective battles. Much anticipated Morning of Owl had some key injuries to their bboys and decided not to compete in 2014. As a result, Jinjo Crew also decided not to compete because they were anticipating to battle with and beat Morning of Owl.

2013 Korea National Championships
Location: Seoul, Korea

Crews in bold won their respective battles. Funky Soul Brothers, Universal Crew and Fusion MC did not qualify to the quarter-finals.

2012 Korea National Championships
Location: Seoul, Korea

Crews in bold won their respective battles.

References

External links
Official site
2011 Teaser 

Breakdance
Street dance competitions